2G+2 is an album of mixed live and studio material by English rock band the Fall, released in 2002. It features three new songs recorded in the studio—"New Formation Sermon", "I Wake Up in the City" and "Distilled Mug Art"—and the rest of the album was recorded at performances on the group's United States tour in late 2001.

Track listing

Personnel
The Fall
 Mark E. Smith – vocals
 Ben Pritchard – guitar, vocals
 Jim Watts – bass guitar, vocals
 Spencer Birtwistle – drums
Additional musicians
 Brian Fanning – guitar (studio tracks only)
 Ed Blaney – guitar (studio tracks only); additional vocals on "Ibis-Afro Man"
Technical
 Mark E. Smith – production, compilation
 Ed Blaney – production, compilation
 Pascal Le Gras - cover art

References

External links
 Lyrics

The Fall (band) compilation albums
The Fall (band) live albums
2002 live albums
2002 compilation albums